Paddy O'Reilly (1898 – 24 September 1974) was an Irish footballer. He competed in the men's tournament at the 1924 Summer Olympics.

References

1898 births
1974 deaths
Irish association footballers (before 1923)
Olympic footballers of Ireland
Footballers at the 1924 Summer Olympics
Place of birth missing
Association football goalkeepers